is a 2001 video game compilation developed by Mass Media and published by Namco for the Game Boy Advance. It contains ports of five of their classic arcade games, Ms. Pac-Man, Pole Position, Dig Dug, Galaga, and Galaxian.

Compilation
Namco Museum for Game Boy Advance was one of the first compilations in the Namco Museum series to omit a virtual museum. The GBA version was released worldwide, and was a launch title for the system in North America. The following games, originally featured in Namco Museum Vol. 1 and Namco Museum Vol. 3 for the PlayStation, are included:
 Ms. Pac-Man (1982)
 Galaga (1981)
 Galaxian (1979)
 Pole Position (1982)
 Dig Dug (1982)

The GBA version does not retain high scores when powered off, which is also the case with Pac-Man Collection.

Reception

The game received "generally favorable reviews" according to the review aggregation website Metacritic. NextGen said of the game, "The emulation is perfect, though GBA's mono speaker warps the timbre of the occasional sound effect. [...] If you can actually see it, you'll love it."

The game sold 2.4 million units in the U.S. and earned $37 million by August 2006. During the period between January 2000 and August 2006, it was the third-highest-selling game for handheld game consoles in that country. By December 2007, that number grew to 2.96 million units.

References

External links
 

2001 video games
Bandai Namco video game compilations
Game Boy Advance games
Game Boy Advance-only games
Infogrames games
Namco games
Single-player video games
Video games developed in the United States